W. Grant McMurray (born July 12, 1947) was Prophet-President of Community of Christ from 1996  until 2004. He was the first non-descendant of Joseph Smith to head the church, and under his administration, the Reorganized Church of Jesus Christ of Latter Day Saints (RLDS Church) changed its name to Community of Christ.

Biography
William Grant McMurray was born in Toronto, Ontario, Canada, to parents who were members of the RLDS Church. He lived in Toronto until his teenage years, when his family moved to Independence, Missouri, where his mother accepted employment at the church headquarters of the RLDS Church. He attended Graceland College and St. Paul School of Theology in Kansas City, Missouri, where he earned a master's degree in theology, making McMurray the first president of the RLDS Church who was trained at a seminary.

In 1973, McMurray began employment with the historical department of the RLDS Church. In 1982, he became the church's World Church Secretary, and in 1992, he became a member of the First Presidency as a counselor to church president Wallace B. Smith. In 1995, Smith announced his retirement and named McMurray as his successor; it was the first time that a non-descendant of church-founder Joseph Smith had been named to head the church.

McMurray's presidency and legacy
McMurray became the president of the church in 1996.

In 1997, McMurray called upon what was RLDS Church to transform itself by articulating a Christ-centered theology of peace. In 2001, the church changed its name to Community of Christ, evoking the original name of the church "Church of Christ," affirming the centrality of Christ to the church, and commemorating the Latter Day Saint movement's long-held tradition of building up "Zionic communities".

McMurray presided over the first ordination of a woman to the office of apostle in the Council of Twelve.  He also led the Community of Christ to a closer fraternal (but not doctrinal) relationship with the Church of Jesus Christ of Latter-day Saints, building both friendly relations and collaborative historical efforts.

McMurray's resignation
On November 29, 2004, McMurray resigned as president of the church.Peggy Fletcher Stack, "Head of former RLDS Church unexpectedly steps down", Salt Lake Tribune, December 3, 2004. McMurray resignation letter stated, "However, along the way I have made some inappropriate choices, and the circumstances of my life are now such that I cannot continue to effectively lead the church. I deeply regret the difficulties that this causes for the church I love."  The letter also later stated that he had recently been diagnosed with early onset Parkinson's disease but his health was not a motivating factor to his resignation.

When later interviewed regarding his resignation letter, McMurray stated "Beyond that, it's an entirely personal and family matter and the letter says what I felt I needed to say."

A joint council of church leaders led by the Council of Twelve Apostles announced in March 2005 the name of Stephen M. Veazey as Prophet-President designate. Veazey had been serving as president of the Council of Twelve. Delegates elected to a special World Conference of the church approved Veazey and he was ordained to the presidency on June 3, 2005.

See also
Kenneth N. Robinson

References

External links 
 

1947 births
Apostles of the Community of Christ
Canadian emigrants to the United States
Canadian members of the Community of Christ
Doctrine and Covenants people
Graceland University alumni
Historians of the Latter Day Saint movement
Living people
Members of the First Presidency (Community of Christ)
Prophet-Presidents of the Community of Christ
People from Independence, Missouri
People from Toronto
People with Parkinson's disease
Saint Paul School of Theology alumni
Canadian Christian religious leaders
Religious leaders from Missouri
Canadian leaders of the Community of Christ